The Big Twenty Township is an administrative division in Aroostook County in northern Maine.  It is one of the largest townships in Maine, and contains Estcourt Station, a village of four people that is the northernmost point in Maine.  The township also contains the northernmost point in New England.

Geography 
The Big Twenty Township is made up of two separate survey townships, T20 R11 and T20 R12 WELS.  It is bordered by Quebec, Canada to the north, east, and west, and by T19 R11 and T19 R12 WELS to the south.  The borders of the township were settled on August 9, 1842, with the signing of the Webster–Ashburton Treaty.  The treaty, named for US Secretary of State Daniel Webster and United Kingdom Privy Counsellor  Lord Ashburton, ended the Aroostook War and also set the Canada–United States border further west.

Population 
The Big Twenty Township has fewer than 20 year-round residents.  The land is used mainly for logging, and the only roads that exist are logging roads; there are no state highways.  Some of the land is owned by camp owners, and several camps straddle the US-Canada border.

In 2002, Michel Jalbert crossed the border from Canada to save 20 cents a gallon on gas and was arrested and imprisoned.  Some people have property that straddles the border, and have received written consent from border patrol to cross the border when they want to avoid issues.

References 

Towns in Aroostook County, Maine
Towns in Maine